The tarantass is a four-wheeled horse-drawn vehicle on a long longitudinal frame, reducing road jolting on long-distance travel. It was widely used in Russia in the first half of the 19th century. It generally carried four passengers. The origin of the word is not known: Fasmer's etymological dictionary lists a number of variants from regional dialects to the ancient Indo-European roots with the mark "doubtful".

In 1840, author Vladimir Sollogub  published a satirical novelette "Tarantass". The main hero of the story drove a team of three horses. In Jules Verne's novel Michael Strogoff it is one of the means of displacement.

The tarantass has been described as two long poles serving as parallel axles supporting a large basket forming a cup or bowl. It is not suspended on springs, and generally has no benches. The vehicle is accessed by an external ladder. The interior is generally covered by straw, changed at intervals for cleanliness, upon which the passengers rest.

An article in a Melbourne Australia newspaper dated 30/9/1887 refers to a journey by the Hon. James Campbell of a drive of 1800 miles by tarantass from Vladivostok to Moscow. [The distance from Vladivostok to Moscow is nearly 9000km, or over 5000 miles, so there is something wrong with this story.]

Existing photographs of tarantasses generally convey the fact of its wheels being exclusively wooden constructions, but it is evidenced that at least on occasion, the tarantass would be rubber-wheeled, requiring inflation, like modern tyres. In Dostoyevsky's The Village of Stepanchikovo, at one point the narrator describes "a tyre that had burst on one of the front wheels of [the] tarantass."

See also 
 Types of carriage

References

External links
 http://www.thefreedictionary.com/Tarantass

Carriages